Urzainqui is a town and municipality located in the province and autonomous community of Navarre, northern Spain. According to the 2017 census, there are 85 inhabitants in the area.

References

External links
 URZAINQUI in the Bernardo Estornés Lasa - Auñamendi Encyclopedia, Euskomedia Fundazioa 
 

Municipalities in Navarre